Echternach (  or (locally) ) is a commune with town status in the canton of Echternach, which is part of the district of Grevenmacher, in eastern Luxembourg. Echternach lies near the border with Germany, and is the oldest town in Luxembourg.

History
The town grew around the Abbey of Echternach, which was founded in  698  by St Willibrord, an English monk from Ripon, Northumbria (in present-day North Yorkshire, England), who became the first bishop of Utrecht and worked to Christianize the Frisians. As bishop, he was the Echternach monastery's abbot until his death in 739. It is in his honour that the notable Dancing procession of Echternach takes place annually on Whit Tuesday.

The river Sauer that flows past the town now forms the border between Luxembourg and Germany; in the later Roman Empire and under the Merovingians by contrast, the Sauer did not form a border or march in this area. The Roman villa at Echternach (traces of which were rediscovered in 1975) was reputed to be the largest north of the Alps. Echternach was later part of the Electorate of Trier (present-day Germany) and was presented to Willibrord by Irmina (Irmine), daughter of Dagobert II, king of the Franks. Other parts of the Merovingians' Roman inheritance were presented to the Abbey by king of the Franks Pepin the Short.

Echternach continued to have royal patronage from the house of Charlemagne. Though the monks were displaced by the canons of the bishop of Trier between 859 and 971, and although Willibrord's buildings burned down in 1017, the Romanesque basilica, with its symmetrical towers, to this day houses Willibrord's tomb in its crypt. The abbey's library and scriptorium had a European reputation. As it flourished, the town of Echternach grew around the abbey's outer walls and was granted a city charter in 1236. The abbey was rebuilt in a handsome Baroque style in 1737. In 1794 the church was sacked and the abbey used as a porcelain factory. In 1797, in the wake of the French Revolution, the monks were dispersed and the abbey's contents and its famous library were auctioned off. Some of the library's early manuscripts, such as the famous Echternach Gospels, are now in the Bibliothèque Nationale in Paris. In the 19th century, a porcelain factory was established in the abbey and the town declined, until the advent of the railroad brought renewed life and an influx of tourists.

During the concluding months of World War II in Europe, on December 16, 1944, Echternach served as the southernmost point on the battlefront for the attempt of the German Wehrmacht forces attacking the Allies to retake Antwerp, during the Battle of the Bulge. The town was badly damaged in World War II but was thoroughly restored.

Culture
There are two main churches in Echternach. The larger is the Abbey's Basilica of St Willibrord, which survives from the original abbey and is a fair monument of Romano-Gothic architecture. The basilica is now surrounded by the eighteenth-century abbey (today a high school) and is located in the heart of the town's historical centre. The other is the parish church of St Peter and Paul, under whose altar lie the remains of St Willibrord. The nearby Prehistory Museum traces mankind's history over the past one million years.

Close to Echternach lies the Echternach lake which hosts several activities every year, like the e-Lake music festival or the "Mill Man Trail" bike race. Since 1975, Echternach has been the site of an International Music Festival, held annually in May and June. The festival was discontinued in 2018.

Population

Gallery

Notable people 
 Johannes Holler (1614–1671) Roman Catholic prelate and Auxiliary Bishop of Trier 1663–1671
 Joseph-Alexandre Müller (1854–1931) Luxembourg composer. 
 Artur Sirk (1900 in Pruuna, Estonia – 1937 in Echternach), Estonian political and military figure. 
 Rob Krier (born 1938), architect
 Léon Krier (born 1946), architect
 Jeannette Goergen-Philip (born 1947) Luxembourg archer, competed at the 1984 and 1992 Summer Olympics 
 Gaston Stronck (born 1957) Luxembourg diplomat
 Georges Lentz (born 1965), Luxembourg composer

 Politicians
 Caspar Mathias Spoo (1837–1914), Luxembourg industrialist and politician. 
 Robert Schaffner (1905–1979), Luxembourg politician, twice mayor of Echternach, 1945-1947 and 1970-1979
 Marie-Josée Frank (born 1952 in Echternach), Luxembourg politician
 Marcel Sauber (born 1939), Luxembourg politician
 Fernand Boden (born 1943), politician from Luxembourg, government minister 1979–2009

References

External links

 
Official Website of Echternach
Everything about Echternach
Harmonie Municipale Echternach
Local Radio Echternach 106,5 FM
Awarded "EDEN - European Destinations of Excellence" non traditional tourist destination 2008
Old postcards of Echternach

 
Cities in Luxembourg
Communes in Echternach (canton)
Towns in Luxembourg
Germany–Luxembourg border crossings
Roman sites in Luxembourg